Morozovka is a rural locality (a settlement) in Morozovskoye Rural Settlement, Ertilsky District, Voronezh Oblast, Russia. The population was 52 as of 2010.

Geography 
Morozovka is located 15 km northwest of Ertil (the district's administrative centre) by road. Maryevka is the nearest rural locality.

References 

Rural localities in Ertilsky District